Iowa Heritage Illustrated was the historical magazine of the State Historical Society of Iowa, published in Iowa City.  It contained stories about Iowa history written for a lay audience, along photographs, reproductions of historic documents, and other media.  Iowa Heritage Illustrated was first published in 1920 as The Palimpsest and renamed in 1996.  It was originally published monthly, was bimonthly from 1973 to 1986, and then was a quarterly publication from 1987 onward.  Its last issue was published in 2014.

References

History magazines published in the United States
Quarterly magazines published in the United States
History of Iowa
Magazines established in 1920
Magazines published in Iowa
State Historical Society of Iowa